The Royal Vietnamese army was the primary military body of the Vietnamese states of Jinghai and Đại Việt and the armed forces of the Vietnamese monarchy from 938 to 1789. It was disbanded and succeeded by the Imperial Vietnamese army of the Nguyễn dynasty in early 19th century.

Organisation

Military branches
 Infantry
 Conscripted-soldiers
 War elephants
 Light cavalry
 Navy

Strength

Conscription was firstly introduced and used in Vietnam by king Lý Thái Tông in 1042. For a detachment of 50 men, 30 were sent back to their native villages for rice cultivation. The soldiers did receive some largesse at the same time as they were expected to do some farming of their own. The Royal Vietnamese army at wars grew from 30,000 in 967 to about 80,000 in 1075; 100,000 in 1285; 120,000 in 1377 and 250,000 in 1471.

Military equipment

939–1407

Siege techniques
 Catapult
 Primitive tanks
 Traction trebuchet (Mongol trebuchet)

Navy
 Mong Dong
 Junk

Firearm
 Fire lance (at least 14th century)
 Hand cannon (at least since 1390)

Gallery

1427–1789

Navy
 Mong Dong
 Junk

Firearm
 Hand cannon
 Cannons
 Musket (at least since 1516)
 Flamethrower

Gallery

See also
 Military history of Vietnam

References

Citation

Sources
 
 
 
 
 

 

  

 
 
  
 

Military history of Vietnam
Army history